Shchastia is a city in the Shchastia Raion of the Luhansk Oblast (province) in Ukraine. Population: 

The Luhansk power station, a large powerplant built in the 1950s, is located north of Shchastia. The town of Shchastia is situated on the Donets river. During the 2014 pro-Russian unrest in Ukraine, the city became a key site of fighting.

History 
The village of Shchastia was founded in 1754.

In 1953, construction began on the Luhansk power station. Shchastia received town status in 1963.

In 2014 Shchastia was controlled by the separatist Luhansk People's Republic from late April 2014 till the Ukrainian army retook the city on 14 June 2014. It was mainly retaken by the volunteer fighters of the Aidar battalion who according to Amnesty International then with “virtually no oversight or control” committed  war crimes in Shchastia and nearby cities. According to Shchastia residents this behaviour continued until Aidar was incorporated into the Ukrainian army in spring 2015.

On 5 August 2014, a monument of Vladimir Lenin was removed from the city of Shchastia.

To facilitate the governance of Luhansk Oblast during the War in Donbas, the Verkhovna Rada on 7 October 2014 made some changes in the administrative divisions, so that the localities in the government-controlled areas were grouped into districts. In particular, Shchastia was transferred from Luhansk Municipality to Novoaidar Raion.

On 9 February 2016 112 Ukraine reported that part of the settlement was under control of Ukrainian forces.

On February 24, 2022, the first day of the 2022 Russian invasion of Ukraine, Shchastia came under attack by Russian forces and was quickly occupied. On the second day of the war, the governor Serhiy Haidai said that 80% of the town has been destroyed in the invasion. According to locals 90% of all houses were destroyed by shelling.

Demographics 
Native language as of the Ukrainian Census of 2001:
Russian 88.0%
Ukrainian 11.2%

Picture gallery

References

External links
Map of the town.

Cities in Luhansk Oblast
Shchastia Raion
Populated places established in the Russian Empire